Mendiguren is a village in Álava, Basque Country, Spain. As of 2019 it has a population of 27. 63% of the population is male while 37% is female.

References

Populated places in Álava